The 1933 Giro d'Italia was the 21st edition of the Giro d'Italia, one of cycling's Grand Tours. The field consisted of 97 riders, and 51 riders finished the race.

By rider

By nationality

References

1933 Giro d'Italia
1933